These are the official results of the Women's Discus Throw event at the 1982 European Championships in Athens, Greece. The final was held at the Olympic Stadium "Spiros Louis" on 8 September 1982.

Medalists

Results

Final
8 September

Participation
According to an unofficial count, 16 athletes from 11 countries participated in the event.

 (3)
 (1)
 (3)
 (1)
 (1)
 (1)
 (1)
 (1)
 (2)
 (1)
 (1)

See also
 1980 Women's Olympic Discus Throw (Moscow)
 1983 Women's World Championships Discus Throw (Helsinki)
 1984 Women's Olympic Discus Throw (Los Angeles)
 1987 Women's World Championships Discus Throw (Rome)
 1988 Women's Olympic Discus Throw (Seoul)

References

 Results

Discus throw
Discus throw at the European Athletics Championships
1982 in women's athletics